Jersey Township is one of eleven townships in Jersey County, Illinois, United States.  As of the 2010 census, its population was 10,165 and it contained 4,398 housing units.

Geography

Cities, towns, villages
 Jerseyville

Adjacent townships
 Rockbridge Township, Greene County (northeast)
 Ruyle Township (northeast)
 Fidelity Township (east)
 Piasa Township (southeast)
 Mississippi Township (south)
 Otter Creek Township (southwest)
 English Township (west)
 Kane Township, Greene County (northwest)

Cemeteries
The township contains these three cemeteries: Keller, Oak Grove and Saint Francis Xavier.

Major highways
  U.S. Route 67
  Illinois Route 16
  Illinois Route 109

Airports and landing strips
 Jersey Community Hospital heliport
 Jerseyville Aviation Airport

Landmarks
 American Legion Fairgrounds

Demographics

School districts
 Jersey Community Unit School District 100
 Southwestern Community Unit School District 9

Political districts
 Illinois's 13th congressional district
 State House District 100
 State Senate District 50

References
 
 United States Census Bureau 2007 TIGER/Line Shapefiles
 United States National Atlas

External links
 City-Data.com
 Illinois State Archives

Townships in Jersey County, Illinois
Townships in Illinois